The Lower Barakka Gardens is a garden in Valletta, Malta, and it is twinned with the Upper Barrakka Gardens.

The gardens have a view of the Grand Harbour and the breakwater. It includes the Monument to Sir Alexander Ball, which is a prominent feature in the form of a neoclassical temple located in the centre of the garden. In addition, the terrace area features various commemorative plaques dedicated to, amongst others, the Hungarian revolution of 1956, the Prague spring, Giuseppe Garibaldi and the 50th anniversary of the European Union. There is also a statue.

References

External links
 

Barrakka Gardens, Lower
Geography of Valletta